Statistics of UAE Football League for the 1995–96 season.

Overview
It was contested by 10 teams, and Sharjah won the championship.

First stage

Playoff

References
United Arab Emirates - List of final tables (RSSSF)

UAE Pro League seasons
United
1995–96 in Emirati football